Tom Funk (born Merton Thompson Funk, 1911–2003) was an illustrator who for some 40 years was associated with the distinctive visual style of the New Yorker magazine, to which he contributed ‘spots’ depicting New York buildings, portraits for profiles of subjects ranging from Pablo Picasso to D. T. Suzuki, and a distinctive style of cartography, as well as general illustrations in the years before the magazine introduced editorial photographs, in the 1990s. His work also appeared in Dramatists Guild Quarterly, Harper's, Woman's Day, Gourmet, House & Garden and Life, and he illustrated books and activity kits for children, as well as textbooks and many cookbooks.

He was married to the illustrator Edna Eicke.

External links 
 A photograph, biography and bibliography, with examples of his work

American illustrators
The New Yorker people
1911 births
2003 deaths